The 2023 F4 Danish Championship season will be the seventh season of the F4 Danish Championship. The season will begin at Padborg Park in April and will conclude at Jyllandsringen in October.

Teams and drivers 
All teams were Danish-registered.

Calendar 
The championship will make two abroad visits to Sweden, combining its grid with Formula Nordic.

Race results

Notes

References

External links 

 

F4 Danish Championship
Danish F4 Championship
F4 Danish Championship seasons
Danish
Danish F4